Llangorwen is a village located in the county of Ceredigion, Mid-Wales. Close to Clarach Bay and a mile north of Aberystwyth.

The Church of All Saints just south of the village, is a grade II* listed building.

Jutting out to sea the Sarn Gynfelyn shingle spit is located a few kilometres north of Llangorwen.

References

Villages in Ceredigion